Mayo Clinic Proceedings is a monthly peer-reviewed medical journal published by Elsevier and sponsored by the Mayo Clinic. It covers the field of general internal medicine. The journal was established in 1926 as the Proceedings of the Staff Meetings of the Mayo Clinic and obtained its current name in 1964. According to the Journal Citation Reports, the journal has a 2017 impact factor of 7.199, ranking it 11th out of 154 journals in the category "Medicine, General & Internal". The journal started online publishing in 1999. Initially, its website consisted of simple lists of tables of content. In 2012, the current website was established. In addition to the journal content, it contains extra features such as Medical Images, Residents Clinics, Art at Mayo, and Stamp Vignettes on Medical Science, as well as author interviews and monthly issue summaries. Readers can also obtain CME credit.

Types of articles published 
Mayo Clinic Proceedings publishes the following types of articles:

 Original Article
 Review Article
 Solicited Review
 Concise Review for Clinicians (continuing medical education – CME – credit is offered with the Concise Review for Clinicians section)
 My Treatment Approach
 Diagnosis and Treatment Guidelines
 Special Article
 Commentary
 Brief Report
 Editorial
 Letter to the Editor
 Medical Images
 Stamp / Historical Vignettes
 Art at Mayo
 Meeting Reports
 Symposium  (continuing medical education – CME – credit is offered with the Symposium collections)
 Case Report
 Residents' Clinic
 Path-to-Patient image quiz

Editors 
The following persons have been editors-in-chief of the journal:
 E. D. Bayrd (1964–1970)
 A. B. Hayles (1971–1976)
 J. L. Juergens (1977–1981)
 R. G. Siekert (1982–1986)
 P. J. Palumbo (1987–1993)
 Udaya B. S. Prakash (1994–1998)
 William L. Lanier (1999–present)

References

External links

Publications established in 1926
General medical journals
Mayo Clinic
English-language journals
Monthly journals
Elsevier academic journals
1926 establishments in Minnesota